Five ships of the Royal Navy have been called HMS Alderney, named after the Island of Alderney.

  was an 8-gun bomb vessel launched in 1735 and hulked in 1741.
  was a 24-gun sixth rate, originally built as HMS Squirrel but renamed in 1742 and launched in 1743. She was sold in 1749.
  was a 12-gun sloop launched in 1757 and sold in 1783. She may have become the whaler , taken by the Spanish in 1797.
  was an  launched in 1945 and broken up in 1972.
She was sold to the Bangladesh Navy in 2002 and renamed .

Royal Navy ship names